Rhadinomyia orientalis is a species of ulidiid or picture-winged fly in the genus Rhadinomyia of the family Tephritidae.

References

Ulidiidae